Deedar  is a 1951 Hindi-language romantic musical film directed by Nitin Bose, starring  Dilip Kumar, Nargis, Ashok Kumar and Nimmi. It is a story of unfulfilled love, where the hero's childhood love is separated from him due to class inequalities. It is one of noted tragedies made in early Hindi cinema. It became a popular film of the Golden era and further established Dilip Kumar as the "King of Tragedy".

Many years later, when Deedar was having a rerun at Mumbai theatres, actor Manoj Kumar asked director Raj Khosla to accompany him to the show. Thereafter, the story of Do Badan (1966) was written after reworking its story line, that film was also a hit. It is referred to repeatedly in the Vikram Seth's 1993 novel A Suitable Boy, in which people watching it burst into tears and people who can't get tickets start a riot. The film was remade in Tamil as Neengadha Ninaivu (1963)  and in Turkish as Seven Unutmaz (1978).

Cast 

Dilip Kumar as Shyamu
Nargis as Mala
Ashok Kumar as Dr. Kishore
Nimmi as Champa
Murad
Tabassum as Baby Mala
Tun Tun as Rai's maidservant
Surendra (as Surrender)
Yakub as Choudhury
Motilal as Bhalla
Parikshit Sahni as Master Shyamu

Soundtrack 
The soundtrack was composed by the legend Naushad, with lyrics by Shakeel Badayuni. The all-around soundtrack consisted of all the elements of a great album. It exploited the talents of singing legends such as Mohammed Rafi, Lata Mangeshkar, Shamshad Begum and G. M. Durrani to the utmost. This was also amongst those few soundtracks in which the career of veteran Mohammed Rafi coincided with that of his idol G. M. Durrani.

References

External links 
 
 Full movie on YouTube
 Deedar soundtrack

1950s Hindi-language films
1950s musical drama films
1951 films
1951 romantic drama films
Films directed by Nitin Bose
Films scored by Naushad
Hindi films remade in other languages
Indian black-and-white films
Indian musical drama films
Indian romantic drama films